Mesodina aeluropis, the aeluropis skipper or montane iris skipper, is a butterfly of the family Hesperiidae. It is endemic to New South Wales, Australia.

The wingspan is about 30 mm.

The larvae feed on Patersonia sericea. They construct a cylindrical shelter made from joined leaves of its host plant where it rests during the day.

External links
Australian Insects
Australian Faunal Directory

Trapezitinae
Butterflies described in 1901